O-Zone is a Moldovan pop group.

O-Zone may also refer to:

 The O-Zone, a music show
 O-Zone (novel), a 1986 novel by Paul Theroux

See also 
 Ozone (disambiguation)